Ben O'Toole (born in Cairns, Australia) is an Australian actor. He is known for his role as Rex Coen in Bloody Hell, his recurring roles in several Australian TV-Series such as Amazing Grace, as well as for his supporting roles in movies such as Hacksaw Ridge (2016) or 12 Strong (2018).

Early life and career
O'Toole grew up in Brisbane. He began performing in the theatre while he studied acting at the Western Australian Academy of Performing Arts (WAAPA) near Perth. After graduating in 2011, his first movie appearance was in a web series titled Sintillate Studios. He eventually relocated to Sydney where he continued his work in theater and acted in several short films. His first appearance in an internationally released film was in The Water Diviner in 2014. That same year, he was cast in the role of Pete in the first three seasons of the TV series Love Child. In 2016, he played the role of Corporal Tom, second in command to drill sergeant Howell played by Vince Vaughn in the award-winning biographical war film Hacksaw Ridge, directed by Mel Gibson.

O'Toole moved to Los Angeles in early 2016. He acted in commercially successful Hollywood movies that provided more international exposure and recognition of his acting abilities. His first leading role was the romantic comedy, Everybody loves Somebody (2017), which was well-received by critics. In 2018, he performed as main actor in the movie Nekrotronic, which was nominated for Best Makeup at the 9th AACTA Awards, but otherwise was rather poorly received both by audience and critics.

Since the beginning of the COVID-19 pandemic, he has almost exclusively appeared in Australian productions. In addition to his performances in series television, he had landed the lead role in the horror comedy Bloody Hell, where he assumed the role of protagonist and also embodied the hallucinations of his alter ego.

Filmography

Film appearances

Television

Stage

References

External links

Profile on Instagram
Artist profile at the acting agency

Australian male film actors
Australian male television actors
Living people
Year of birth missing (living people)